Hoseyn Qeshlaqi Hajj Khvajehlu (also Romanized as Ḩoseyn Qeshlāqī Ḩājj Khvājehlū) is a village in Aslan Duz Rural District, Aslan Duz District, Parsabad County, Ardabil Province, Iran. At the 2006 census, its population was 256, in 46 families.

References 

Towns and villages in Parsabad County